Ralf J. J. Mackenbach (born 4 October 1995) is a Dutch plasma physicist, artist and former child singer, best known for winning the Junior Eurovision Song Contest 2009 with the song "Click Clack". He is the first and so far only Dutch winner of the contest.

Biography

Early life
Mackenbach was born in Best, North Brabant and has an older brother Rick (born 1993). As a child, he starred in the musicals Tarzan and Beauty and the Beast. He attended Amsterdam's dancing academy Lucia Marthas, and studied acting at Centrum voor de Kunsten Eindhoven (CKE) in Eindhoven.

Musical career

In 2009, at the age of thirteen, Mackenbach won the 2009 edition of Junior Songfestival with the song "Click Clack". As a result, he represented the Netherlands in the Junior Eurovision Song Contest 2009, and went on to win the competition with 121 points. "Click Clack" peaked at number 7 in the Dutch Single Top 100.

Mackenbach's debut album Ralf achieved a top 10 spot in the Dutch album charts and entered the Flemish album charts at number 59. In March 2011, it achieved gold status with over 25,000 sales.

In 2011, he participated in the show . He was a judge on the 2011 edition of the Dutch talent show My Name is…. In 2019, he appeared as a judge on the Dutch adaptation of All Together Now.

Academic career
After graduating secondary school with a VWO certificate, Mackenbach studied at the Eindhoven University of Technology. In 2019, he finished a master's degree in nuclear fusion, for which he wrote the dissertation Numerical Modelling of Mode Penetration in Cylindrical Geometries using M3D-C1.

Discography

Albums
 Ralf (2010)
 Moving On (2011)
 Seventeen (2012)

References

External links

1995 births
Living people
21st-century Dutch physicists
21st-century Dutch singers
Dutch child singers
Dutch male dancers
Dutch male musical theatre actors
Dutch nuclear physicists
Dutch people of Austrian descent
Dutch people of German descent
Dutch pop singers
Dutch singer-songwriters
Eindhoven University of Technology alumni
Academic staff of the Eindhoven University of Technology
Junior Eurovision Song Contest entrants for the Netherlands
Junior Eurovision Song Contest winners
People from Best, Netherlands
Tap dancers